Seigneurial system may refer to:
 Manorialism - the socio-economic system of the Middle Ages and Early Modern period
 Seigneurial system of New France (Canada)